Say It with Music (Swedish: Säg det i toner) is a 1929 Swedish musical film directed by Edvin Adolphson and Julius Jaenzon and starring Håkan Westergren, Elisabeth Frisk and Stina Berg. It was shot at the Råsunda Studios in Stockholm with a soundtrack added in a Berlin studio that had been converted to sound. The film's sets were designed by the art director Vilhelm Bryde. It came during the switch from silent to sound film and lacks any dialogue. It was one of three Swedish films released that year that including some element of sound, and came at a time when film production was in crisis with no films released during the first nine months of 1929. It is also known by the alternative title The Dream Waltz.

Cast
 Håkan Westergren as 	Olof Svensson
 Stina Berg as 	Mrs. Svensson
 Elisabeth Frisk as 	Lisa Lindahl
 Tore Svennberg as 	Mr. Lindahl
 Jenny Hasselqvist as 	Mrs. Lindahl
 Margit Manstad as 	Ingrid Mårtenson
 Edvin Adolphson as 	Mrs. Lindahl's lover
 Erik Malmberg as 	Man 
 Axel Nilsson as 	Man 
 Björn Berglund as 	Nutte 
 Helga Brofeldt as 	Woman at restaurant 
 Ossian Brofeldt as 	Husband at restaurant 
 Knut Frankman as 	Docker 
 Karl Gerhard as 	Self
 Eric Gustafson as 	Man who borrows matches
 Justus Hagman as 	Cashier 
 Sture Lagerwall as Olof's friend 
 Herman Lantz as 	Docker at accident 
 Thyra Leijman-Uppström as Maid 
 Otto Malmberg as 	Servant 
 Nils Ohlin as 	Man at music publishing company 
 Aina Rosén as 	Clerk at music publishing company 
 Stina Ståhle as 	Clerk at music publishing company 
 Åke Uppström as Olof's friend 
 Astrid Wedberg as Lindahl's Maid 
 Karl Wehle as The great composer 
 Kurt Welin as 	Student

References

Bibliography 
 Gustafsson, Tommy. Masculinity in the Golden Age of Swedish Cinema: A Cultural Analysis of 1920s Films. McFarland, 2014.

External links 
 

1929 films
Swedish musical films
1929 musical films
1920s Swedish-language films
Swedish black-and-white films
Films directed by Edvin Adolphson
1920s Swedish films